Chicken George may refer to:

An ancestor of Alex Haley, popularized both in the book and TV miniseries Roots
Chicken George (politics), the name for a series of costumed men who shadowed George H. W. Bush during the 1992 U.S. presidential election
Chicken George (restaurant chain), a former fast food restaurant chain based in Baltimore, Maryland, U.S.
Nickname of George Lawrence (footballer) (born 1962), who played for Southampton in the 1980s
Nickname of George Lwandamina, Zambian National Soccer Team head coach